Evans is a male name and surname of Welsh, and possibly Cornish, origin. Within Wales it is the fifth most common surname and is the tenth most common in England. Within the United States, it is ranked as the 48th-most common surname. The male name Evans in Greek is Evangelos.

Origin
Evans is of Welsh origin. In its anglicised form, the name means "son of Evan". Regarding its Welsh roots, it is a derivative of the name Ifan, a cognate of John. In the Welsh language, the f produces the v sound; Ifan (Ivan) became Evan. Another school of thought is that ‘Evan’ ( Yvain, Yvainne) is the latinised Norman-French derivation of ‘Owain’. An example of this is ‘Yvain des Galles’ , better known as ‘Owain Llawgoch’ in his native Wales.
In the Welsh language the patronymic "ab Evan" resulted in the anglicized surname "Bevan", which is also common in Wales. Evans is a popular name in England, Scotland, Wales, Ireland, United States of America, Canada, and Australia.

The similarity to the Slavic name Ivan is not accidental, as it is also a cognate of John.

Notable persons named Evans
 See List of people with surname Evans

References

English-language surnames
Surnames of Welsh origin
Anglo-Cornish surnames
Anglicised Welsh-language surnames
Welsh-language surnames
Patronymic surnames